is a large shopping and entertainment complex in Fukuoka, Japan.  Called the "city within the city," it boasts numerous attractions including shops; cafes; restaurants; a theater; game center; cinemas; two hotels; and a canal, which runs through the complex.

Located adjacent to Fukuoka's entertainment district and between the commercial and retail core of the city, Canal City has become a tourist attraction and commercial success for Fukuoka.  It is the largest private development in the history of Japan ($1.4 billion for 234,460 m2 (2.5-million sq. ft.)).  It is built with a distinctive fanciful style, with many curving sculptures and fountains and city of Fukuoka hardly visible, to create an atmosphere like an oasis away from the rest of the town.

Canal City Hakata is within a 10- to 15-minute walk from either Hakata Station or Tenjin Station.

History
With Canal City in business, areas around the complex began to see increased success as well.  The nearby food markets, in decline and seeing little business, began to rebuild and rehire shops because of the foot traffic from Canal City.

Gallery

See also
 Jerde-associated architectural projects in Japan:
Namba Parks (Osaka)
Riverwalk Kitakyushu
Roppongi Hills (Tokyo)

References

External links

 Canal City Hakata official site (in Japanese)

Buildings and structures in Fukuoka
Tourist attractions in Fukuoka
Shopping malls established in 1996
Shopping centres in Japan
1996 establishments in Japan